Belles-Forêts is a commune in the Moselle department in Grand Est in northeastern France.
This commune was created in 1973 by the fusion of: Angviller-lès-Bisping (German: Angweiler), Bisping (German: Bisping) and Desseling (German: Disselingen) (till 1986).

Population

See also
 Communes of the Moselle department
 Parc naturel régional de Lorraine

References

External links
 

Communes of Moselle (department)